Real Communist Party of India (alt. Realist Communist Party of India) was a political party in India which existed around 1991. Most probably it was a splinter group of Revolutionary Communist Party of India. The party ran in state assembly elections in West Bengal and Assam 1991. In the constituency Santipur, West Bengal the party candidate Asim Ghosh got 54 666 votes (42,79%), but was defeated by the Indian National Congress candidate Ajoy Dey. Ghosh had the support of the Left Front.

In Assam the party candidate Hali Rabha 488 votes (0,73%) in the constituency Chaygaon and in Jonay the party candidate Ayodhya Kumar Pegu got 564 votes (0,72%).

What then happened to the party is unclear, but most probably it was reunited with Revolutionary Communist Party of India (Asim Ghosh represented Revolutionary Communist Party of India in Santipur in the assembly elections 2001).

Defunct communist parties in India
Political parties established in 1991
1991 establishments in India
Political parties with year of disestablishment missing